Onano is a comune (municipality) in the Province of Viterbo in the Italian region Lazio, located about  northwest of Rome and about  northwest of Viterbo.  

Onano borders the following municipalities: Acquapendente, Gradoli, Grotte di Castro, Latera, Sorano.

Main sights
Palazzo Madama or Castello Monaldeschi, medieval castle-mansion built around 1350. 
Church of Santa Maria della Conciliazione (1784)
Romanesque church of Madonna delle Grazie, housing several frescoes by the Sienese School
Small church of Madonna del Piano (1492), housing a Virgin with Child by Antonio del Massaro

References

Cities and towns in Lazio